Copper Mountain may refer to:

Places in Canada
Copper Mountain (Alberta)
Copper Mountain (British Columbia)
Copper Mountain, British Columbia, Canada

Places in the United States
Copper Mountains, a mountain in Arizona
Copper Mountain (Colorado), a mountain and ski resort
Copper Mountain, Colorado, United States, a census-designated place
Peak Mountain or Copper Mountain, a mountain in Connecticut
Copper Mountain (Idaho), a peak of the Sawtooth Range in Idaho
Copper Mountain (Montana), a mountain in Madison County, Montana
Copper Mountain (Nevada)
Copper Mountain (South Dakota), a mountain in South Dakota
Copper Mountain (Mason County, Washington), a summit in Olympic National Park
Copper Mountain (Pierce County, Washington), a summit in Mount Rainier National Park
Copper Mountain (Whatcom County, Washington), a summit in North Cascades National Park

Other uses
Copper Mountain (film), a 1983 film
Copper Mountain Solar Facility, a facility in Boulder City, Nevada